No. 624 Squadron RAF was at first a special duties squadron of the Royal Air Force during World War II. It was later in the war tasked with mine-spotting, until disbanded at the end of the war.

History

Special duties
No. 624 Squadron was formed by raising No. 1575 Flight RAF to squadron status at Blida in Algeria, North Africa at the end of September 1943. The squadron continued to carry out special duties operations formerly done by 1575 flight into Italy, Southern France, Yugoslavia and Czechoslovakia. These operations included supply dropping and the insertion of agents to the resistance. For these duties the squadron operated at first with Lockheed Venturas and Handley Page Halifaxes, and later Short Stirling Mk.IVs. As a result of the allied advances in France and Italy, the need for 624 squadron in this role had declined and it was therefore disbanded on 5 September 1944.

Mine spotting
No. 624 Squadron was reformed on 28 December 1944 at Grottaglie in Italy. Equipped with Walrus amphibious planes, it was now tasked with the role of mine-spotting along the Italian and Greek coasts. It had detachments and bases at Foggia, Hassani, Falconara, Rosignano, Treviso, Hal Far, Sedes  and Littorio, until the squadron finally disbanded on 30 November 1945.

Aircraft operated

Commanding officers

References

Notes

Bibliography

External links

 History of 624 Squadron on RAF website
 Squadron histories and more for nos. 621–650 sqn on RAFWeb
 History in the words of the unsung heroes who flew in 624 Squadron
 Memorial to 624 sqn personnel

Aircraft squadrons of the Royal Air Force in World War II
624 Squadron
Military units and formations established in 1943
Military units and formations disestablished in 1945